The Rise and Fall of Little Voice is a 1992 play written by English dramatist Jim Cartwright.

Production history

Sam Mendes directed the first production at the Royal National Theatre that transferred to the Aldwych Theatre in London's West End.

The 1993 Steppenwolf Theatre Company production transferred to Broadway in April produced by James and Charlene Nederlander, Dennis Grimaldi, and Leonard Saloway.

A West End revival of the play ran in London from 8 October 2009 to 30 January 2010. Following the success of the play, Diana Vickers won the London Newcomer award at the Theatregoers' Choice Award and added "Sunlight" the closing ballad as a B-side for her debut single, "Once".

A London revival ran at The Union Theatre in Southwark from 2 to 26 June 2016. The production starred Charlotte Gorton as Mari, Carly Thomas as Little Voice and Ken Christianson as Ray Say. It was directed by Alastair Knights and was nominated for five Off West End Awards.

In February 2004  Sarah Frankcom directed a performance at the Royal Exchange, Manchester with Denise Black as Mari Hoff, Emma Lowndes as Little Voice, Roy Barraclough as Mr Boo and Andrew Sheridan as Billy. Denise Black won a MEN Award for her performance.

In June 2012 at the Octagon Theatre, Bolton Sue Devaney, Max Beesley snr, Sally Bankes, Katie Elin-Salt and Matt Healey performed the play to standing ovations each night. The production, directed by Elizabeth Newman and designed by Ciaran Bagnall, received five star reviews and a place in the theatre's record books as an extra week of the run had to be scheduled due to its popularity. Octagon Theatre Bolton, The Rise and Fall of Little Voice.

A UK touring production opened 3 September 2012 at the Yvonne Arnaud Theatre in Guildford. Starring Beverley Callard as Mari, Joe McGann as Ray, Ray Quinn as Billy, Duggie Brown as Mr Boo and Jess Robinson as Little Voice and was directed by the play's writer Jim Cartwright. The production was due to end at the Lyceum Theatre, Sheffield in December 2012. After a short interval this production resumed at the end of January in Newcastle and ran until the end of June 2013, visiting Torquay, Portsmouth, Tunbridge Wells, Brighton, Buxton amongst numerous venues. Joe McGann left the tour part way through and was replaced by Philip Andrew (who had been the understudy for the role).

The Barn Theatre in Cirencester (UK) revived the play in June 2018. Described as 'A brilliant and brash revival' by The Stage* it included Sarah Louise Hughes in '...a spectacular debut*' straight from her training at Italia Conti as LV. The production was directed by Michael Strassen.

In 2022 a new tour embarked around the UK, directed by Bronagh Lagan. It starred Christina Bianco as Little Voice, Shobna Gulati as Mari, Ian Kelsey as Ray, Fiona Mulvaney as Sadie/US Marie, Akshay Gulati as Billy, William Ilkley as Mr Boo/US Ray, James Robert Moore as The Phone Man/US Billy & Mr Boo and Anna Hale as understudy LV/Sadie. 

The play has been presented internationally, in Kuala Lumpur, Bangkok and Sri Lanka, in January 2008, by the British Theatre Playhouse.

Historical casting

Film adaptation

The play was adapted for a 1998 film by Mark Herman, with Jane Horrocks reprising her original stage role. Brenda Blethyn assumed the role of Mari Hoff and was nominated for the Academy Award for Best Supporting Actress.

References

Further reading

External links
 

1992 plays
British plays adapted into films
Broadway plays
Comedy plays
Plays by Jim Cartwright
Laurence Olivier Award-winning plays
West End plays